Wada Dam is a rockfill dam located in Aomori Prefecture in Japan. The dam is used for flood control. The catchment area of the dam is 21.8 km2. The dam impounds about 33  ha of land when full and can store 3055 thousand cubic meters of water. The construction of the dam was started on 1971 and completed in 1996.

References

Dams in Aomori Prefecture
1996 establishments in Japan